Tennis was among the sports contested at the 2021 Southeast Asian Games and held at Hanaka Sports & Entertainment Center in Bắc Ninh, Vietnam. It took place from 13 to 22 May 2022.  Seven events were featured for tennis namely: men's singles, women's singles, men's doubles, women's doubles, mixed doubles, men's team and women's team.

Medalists

Medal table

References

External links
 

2021
Southeast Asian Games 2021
2021 Southeast Asian Games events
Southeast Asian Games